Novoalexeyevka is a rural locality (a selo) in Gorod Zavitinsk Urban Settlement of Zavitinsky District, Amur Oblast, Russia. The population was 111 as of 2018. There are 3 streets.

Geography 
Novoalexeyevka is located 17 km northwest of Zavitinsk (the district's administrative centre) by road. Tur is the nearest rural locality.

References 

Rural localities in Zavitinsky District